Veče sa Ivanom Ivanovićem is a Serbian late-night talk show, created and hosted by Ivan Ivanović. It was initially premiere-broadcast on Prva Srpska Televizija, from 14 May 2010, before moving to Nova S in April 2019. It currently premieres on Friday evenings at 10pm on Nova S, and on Monday evenings at 11pm on Nova BH (for Bosnia and Herzegovina).

Series overview

Episodes

Series 1 (2010)

Series 2 (2010–11)

Series 3 (2011–12)

Series 4 (2012–13)

Series 5 (2013–14)

Series 6 (2014–15)

Series 7 (2015–16)

Series 8 (2016–17)

Series 9 (2017–18)

Series 10 (2018–19)

Series 11 (2019–20)

See also
 Marko Živić Show

References 

Serbian television talk shows
2010 Serbian television series debuts
Prva Srpska Televizija original programming